Der Mann aus Stahl is a 1922 German silent drama film directed by Joseph Delmont and starring Luciano Albertini, Wilhelm Diegelmann and Carola Toelle.

Cast
Luciano Albertini
Wilhelm Diegelmann
Carola Toelle
Hermann Vallentin
Magnus Stifter
Fritz Schulz
Robert Leffler
Rudolf del Zopp

References

External links

Films of the Weimar Republic
Films directed by Joseph Delmont
German silent feature films
German black-and-white films
1922 drama films
German drama films
Silent drama films
1920s German films
1920s German-language films